is a Japanese voice actress affiliated with Axlone. She voiced Sakura Haruno in Naruto and Sophitia in Soulcalibur.

On November 28, 2022, she was diagnosed with ulcerative colitis and had a medical treatment.

Filmography

Anime series
Dual! Parallel Trouble Adventure (1999) – Yayoi Schwael
Naruto (2002–2007) – Sakura Haruno
Naruto: Shippuden (2007–2017) – Sakura Haruno, Suzume
Gintama (2009) – Tom
K-on! (2010) – Mrs. Kawakami
Eureka Seven AO (2012) – Rebecka Hallström
Magic Kaito 1412 (2015) – Reiko Imaizumi
Boruto: Naruto Next Generations (2017–) – Sakura Haruno
Tokyo Ghoul:re (2018) – Matsumae
Dororo (2019) – Nui No Kata

Unknown date
Gilgamesh – Kiyoko Madoka
Ojamajo Doremi series – Rere
Musashi Gundoh – Yumehime
Darker than Black: Kuro no Keiyakusha – Brita
Oh My Goddess! – Satoko Yamano
Natsume's Book of Friends – Winged Yōkai
Gankutsuou – Eugénie de Danglars)
XxxHolic – Nanami   
Zoids Fuzors – Sweet
Samurai Flamenco – Sumi Ishihara
Ghost Hound – Chika Nakajima
Kindaichi Case Files – Erina Tougami
Ace Attorney – Chihiro Ayasato
Delicious Party Pretty Cure - Akiho Nagomi (eps 1-34)

Original video animation
Weiß Kreuz (1999) – Reina

Anime films
The Last: Naruto the Movie (2014) – Sakura Haruno
Boruto: Naruto the Movie (2015) – Sakura Uchiha

Video games
Battle Stadium D.O.N – Sakura Haruno
Soulcalibur Legends – Sophitia Alexandra
Soulcalibur IV – Sophitia
Soulcalibur: Broken Destiny – Sophitia
Soulcalibur V – Elysium
Warriors Orochi 3 Ultimate – Sophitia
Soulcalibur VI – Sophitia
Tactics Ogre: Reborn – Arycelle Dania

Unknown date
Eureka Seven: New Wave & New Vision – Jillian
Mobile Suit Gundam Senki Record U.C. 0081 – Sherry)
Naruto series – Sakura Haruno
Radiata Stories – Alicia
Sonic Riders – Wave the Swallow
Sonic Riders: Zero Gravity – Wave the Swallow
Sonic Free Riders – Wave the Swallow
Valkyrie Profile: Covenant of the Plume – Rosa

Dubbing

Live-action
Amy Adams
American Hustle – Sydney Prosser
Arrival – Louise Banks
Batman v Superman: Dawn of Justice – Lois Lane
Cruel Intentions 2 – Kathryn Merteuil
Dear Evan Hansen – Cynthia Murphy
Justice League – Lois Lane
Man of Steel – Lois Lane
Trouble with the Curve – Mickey Lobel
 Vice – Lynne Vincent Cheney
 Zack Snyder's Justice League – Lois Lane

Kirsten Dunst
Eternal Sunshine of the Spotless Mind – Mary Svevo
Mona Lisa Smile – Elizabeth "Betty" Warren (Jones)
Upside Down – Eden Moore
Wimbledon – Lizzie

Other
24 – Jane Sanders (Season 3) (Alexandra Lydon)
American Pie Presents: The Naked Mile – Tracy Sterling (Jessy Schram)
American Wedding – Cadence (January Jones)
Aquamarine – Clare (Emma Roberts)
Autumn in My Heart – Shin Yoo-mi (Han Na-na)
Bear in the Big Blue House – Shadow (Tara Mooney)
Black & White: The Dawn of Justice – Lan Hsi-Ying (Janine Chang)
Black Widow – Antonia Dreykov / Taskmaster (Olga Kurylenko)
Bride Wars – Emma Allen (Anne Hathaway)
Camp Rock – Tess (Meaghan Jette Martin)
The Cloverfield Paradox – Ava Hamilton (Gugu Mbatha-Raw)
Cold Case – Elissa (Marisol Nichols)
Curse of Chucky – Nica Pierce (Fiona Dourif)
Day of the Dead – Corporal Sarah Cross/Bowman (Mena Suvari)
Deep Blue Sea – Bird (Mary Kay Bergman (voice)/Frank Welker (song)) (Software Edition)
Flying Swords of Dragon Gate – Zhang Xiao Wen (Gwei Lun-mei)
Goodbye Christopher Robin – Olive / Nou (Kelly Macdonald)
The Greatest Showman – Charity Hallett-Barnum (Michelle Williams)
Green Book – Dolores Vallelonga (Linda Cardellini)
Jeepers Creepers – Trish Jenner (Gina Philips)
Killer Condom/Kondom des Grauens – Phyllis Higgins (Becker Meretto)
Lake Placid: Legacy – Alice (Sai Bennett)
Lara Croft: Tomb Raider (2004 Fuji TV edition) – Girls of Lara
Life Is Beautiful/La vita è bella – Teacher (Alessandra Grassi)
Monster Hunt – Huo Xiaolan (Bai Baihe)
My Brother – Miryon (Lee Bo-young)
Nanny McPhee – Evangeline (Kelly Macdonald)
Narcos: Mexico – Mika Camarena (Alyssa Diaz)
Oblivion – Julia Rusakova Harper (Olga Kurylenko)
Ong-Bak: Muay Thai Warrior – Mue (Pumawari Yotogamon)
Pan Am – Kate Cameron (Kelli Garner)
Replicas – Mona Foster (Alice Eve)
Road Trip – Tiffany Henderson (Rachel Blanchard)
RV – Kathy Munro (JoJo)
SEAL Team – Amanda "Mandy" Ellis (Jessica Paré)
Simple Simon – Jennifer (Cecilia Forss)
Suspiria (1998 DVD edition) – Pat Hingle (Eva Axén)
The Tale of Sweeney Todd – Alice (Selina Boyack)
Touch – Clea Hopkins (Gugu Mbatha-Raw)
Zoo – Jamie Campbell (Kristen Connolly)

Animation
Casper's Haunted Christmas – Holly Jollimore
DC Super Hero Girls – Batgirl
Klaus – Alva
Moana – Sina
Paddington Bear – Judy Brown
Sheriff Callie's Wild West – Sheriff Callie
Teamo Supremo – Gene

References

External links
 
Official agency profile 

Living people
Japanese video game actresses
Japanese voice actresses
Voice actresses from Tokyo
20th-century Japanese actresses
21st-century Japanese actresses
Year of birth missing (living people)